The 2015 Danmark Rundt was a men's road bicycle race which was held from 4 August to 8 August 2015. It was the 25th edition of the stage race, which was established in 1985. The race was rated as a 2.HC event and formed part of the 2015 UCI Europe Tour. The race was made up of six stages over five days and includes an individual time trial.

Teams
A total of 18 teams with 8 riders each raced in the 2015 Danmark Rundt: 4 UCI ProTeams, 9 UCI Professional Continental Teams, 4 UCI Continental Teams along with a Danish national team under the Team Post Danmark name.

Schedule
There were six stages over five days with both a short mass start and individual time trial on day four.

Classification leadership

Final standings

General classification

Young riders classification (U23)

Points classification

Mountains classification

Team classification

References

External links
Official site (Danish)

Danmark Rundt
Danmark Rundt
Danmark Rundt